Palace of the Vampire Queen is a Dungeons & Dragons role-playing game adventure published by Wee Warriors in 1976. It is notable for being the first stand-alone role-playing adventure published.

Contents
Palace of the Vampire Queen is a simple early scenario for TSR's Dungeons & Dragons role-playing game set in a five-level dungeon, with maps for both the players and the GM. The adventure is set on the isle of Baylor in the Misty Isles archipelago.

Publication history
Palace of the Vampire Queen was written by Pete and Judy Kerestan, with art by Brad Schenck under his pseudonym "Morno". It was published as 15 loose-leaf sheets and an outer folder. Despite being an unlicensed D&D product, TSR made an arrangement with Wee Warriors in 1976 for exclusive distribution to promote sales of D&D, making Palace of the Vampire Queen one of the first four Wee Warriors products to be widely sold as a result. Occasionally copies of the adventure would arrive at TSR missing a page; TSR staff would add a photocopy of the missing page to the package.  

Palace of the Vampire Queen was the first published standalone role-playing game adventure. Although TSR's adventure Temple of the Frog had been published a year prior and thus was the first published RPG adventure, it was included in the D&D Blackmoor expansion booklet, and was not a stand-alone adventure; TSR did not publish any stand-alone adventures until 1978.

Wee Warriors published a second edition in 1976 that consisted of either 17 or 24 loose-leaf sheets — sometimes pages were printed double-sided, sometimes only single-sided. The third and fourth printings in 1976 were 13 double-sided loose-leaf pages. 

Wee Warriors followed up in 1977 with a second adventure set on Baylor, Dwarven Glory, which was also distributed by TSR. 

However, late in 1977, the rapidly growing TSR stopped distributing third-party merchandise, and the fifth printing of Palace of the Vampire Queen took the form of a pamphlet-sized 30-page center-bound book that was distributed by Wee Warriors. The sixth and final edition, also distributed by Wee Warriors, was a 28-page pamphlet-sized book with a cardstock cover. 

A third D&D adventure, Misty Isles, also set in the Misty Isles archipelago, was released in 1977 and was also distributed by Wee Warriors. 

Wee Warriors ceased publication in 1978. In 2019, Precis Intermedia acquired the Wee Warriors product line, with a re-release of Palace of the Vampire Queen as a remastered reprint.

Reception

References

Fantasy role-playing game adventures
Role-playing game supplements introduced in 1976